82 R.B. is a village in Raisinghnagar tehsil in Sri Ganganagar district in the Indian state of Rajasthan.

Demography 
According to the 2011 Census of India, the population of the village was 535, of which 278 were male and 257 female. The census also reported that the village had a literacy rate of 78.82%, higher than the 66.11% of Rajasthan in general.

The primary religions are Hinduism and Sikhism.

Economy
Economy of the 82 R.B.is dependent on agriculture in the surrounding area.

Climate
The climate of 82 R.B. varies to extreme limits. The summer temperature reaches up to 50° Celsius and winter temperature dips just around -1° Celsius. The average annual rainfall is above 40 cm.

Places of interest 
82 R.B. has a well-known temple to Thakurji, A Hanuman mandir (temple) and a Hariram Dada Takiya.

References

Villages in Sri Ganganagar district